Per Jonas Sven Ågren (born 12 April 1962) is a Swedish former footballer who played as a defender.

Club career 
Ågren represented Malmö FF for most of his career and served as club captain for the club between 1989 and 1992. He played a total of 329 games for the club, and won two Swedish Championships and three Svenska Cupen titles during his time at Malmö.

Ågren finished up his career with a final season with rivals Helsingborgs IF.

International career 
Ågren appeared twice for the Sweden U21 team in 1992.

Post-playing career 
After his playing career Ågren worked within the Swedish Football Association and a civil career inside banking. Ågren held the position of director of sports for Malmö FF between 2011 and 2013.

Personal life 
He is the father of San José Earthquakes defender Oskar Ågren.

Honours 
Malmö FF

 Swedish Champion: 1986, 1988
 Allsvenskan: 1985, 1986, 1987, 1988, 1989
 Svenska Cupen: 1983–84, 1985–86, 1988–89

References

1962 births
Living people
Swedish footballers
Malmö FF players
Helsingborgs IF players

Association football defenders